Charles Randall "Randy" Murray is a Canadian guitarist, and was a long-serving member of Bachman–Turner Overdrive. From 1989 to 1992 he taught music, did custom recordings and held a radio talk show in Prince George, British Columbia. From the late 1970s to 1989, Murray was a fixture on the B.C./Alberta music scene. He was a member of the BTO line-up that was fronted by Tim Bachman while there were two versions of the group in the late 1980s, and again (this time along with Blair Thornton, Robbie Bachman, and Fred Turner) from 1991 until 2005, making this line-up the longest enduring of all the various Bachman-Turner Overdrive,B.T.O. and BTO incarnations. He currently works as the Communications Officer for the Diocese of New Westminster in Vancouver, teaches guitar in Vancouver, and still plays occasional shows.

Accomplishments
1988 - Formed the Surreal McCoys, a classic rock band who were resident at Vancouver's Roxy club.
1987/1988 - Toured with Tim Bachman, performing BTO tunes.
1985 - Released the EP Warm Hands/Cold Heart under the name Voxphantom.
1984-1989 - Collaborated with Dave Reimer in the Invaders, a classic rock band.
Early 1980s - Member of David Raven, who released an EP on the Radioactive label.
Early 1980s - Member of Ennis-Murray Band, with Paul Ennis, Mike Rogers, Jeff Sugarman
Late 1970s - Member of X-Static, with Paul Ennis and Ron MacDonald

References

Sources
"BTO official website" Retrieved 23 Jan 2007.
"Randy Murray" Retrieved 23 Jan 2007.
"CanadianBands.com" Retrieved 26 Oct 2015.

External links
Photography of artist at Great Write Up
CanadianBands.com

Year of birth missing (living people)
Living people
Bachman–Turner Overdrive members
Canadian rock guitarists
Canadian male guitarists